The following is a list of notable deaths in August 1998.

Entries for each day are listed alphabetically by surname. A typical entry lists information in the following sequence:
 Name, age, country of citizenship at birth, subsequent country of citizenship (if applicable), reason for notability, cause of death (if known), and reference.

August 1998

1
Joel Barr, 82, American spy for the Soviet Union.
Eva Bartok, 71, Hungarian-British actress.
Len Duncan, 87, American race car driver.
Norman Kretzmann, 69, American academic, multiple myeloma.
Josef Ludl, 82, Czech football player.
France Mihelič, 91, Slovene painter.
Ray Rigby, 49, Australian shot putter, weightlifter and Olympian.

2
Otto Bumbel, 84, Brazilian football player and coach.
Mapy Cortés, 88, Puerto Rican actress, heart attack.
Tommy Faile, 69, American songwriter and singer, heart attack.
Jim Hadnot, 58, American basketball player.
Shari Lewis, 65, American ventriloquist and puppeteer, viral pneumonia.

3
Ronnie Boon, 89, Welsh rugby player.
Francesc Xavier Bultó, 86, Spanish businessman.
Reizo Koike, 82, Japanese swimmer and Olympic medalist, lung cancer.
Alfred Schnittke, 63, German-Russian composer, complications from strokes.
Alan Walsh, 81, British-Australian physicist, originator of atomic absorption spectroscopy.

4
Yury Artyukhin, 68, Soviet and Russian cosmonaut and engineer, cancer.
Carmen Delia Dipini, 70, Puerto Rican singer.
Richard Dunn, 54, British television executive.
Thomas Joseph McDonough, 86, American prelate of the Roman Catholic Church.
Al-Qarshi Abd ur-Raheem Salaam, 62, Yemeni poet and playwright.

5
Arthur Ceuleers, 82, Belgian footballer.
Kesab Chandra Gogoi, 73, Indian politician.
Albert Johnson, 80, English rugby player.
Otto Kretschmer, 86, German U-boat commander during World War II, boating accident.
Britt Lindeborg, 70, Swedish lyricist, singer, composer and writer.
Yevgeny Shabayev, 25, Russian artistic gymnast, heart attack.
Eldon Shamblin, 82, American guitarist and arranger.
Eugene L. Stewart, 78, American lawyer and law professor.
Todor Zhivkov, 86, Bulgarian politician and former president of Bulgaria, pneumonia.

6
Henk Bosveld, 57, Dutch footballer, heart attack.
Jack Brickhouse, 82, American sportscaster, heart attack.
Francesco Capocasale, 81, Italian football player and coach.
Nat Gonella, 90, English jazz trumpeter, bandleader and vocalist.
André Weil, 92, French mathematician.
Deng Zhaoxiang, 95, Chinese naval officer.

7
Richard W. Fellows, 83, American Air Force officer.
William Hiesey, 94, American botanist.
Dick Offenhamer, 85, American football and baseball player and coach.
Peggy Phango, 69, South African actress and singer.
Harry Tuzo, 80, British army general.

8
Sam Balter, 88, American basketball player and sportscaster.
Giulio Bresci, 76, Italian road racing cyclist.
Raymond E. Brown, 70, American Catholic priest.
Barbara Burke, 81, British and South African sprint runner and Olympic medalist.
Idella Jones Childs, 95, American historian and civil rights activist.
Anna J. Harrison, 85, American organic chemist and professor of chemistry.
Satoshi Murayama, 29, Japanese shogi player, bladder cancer.
Walter Merlo, 33, Italian long-distance runner, mountaineering accident.
Dagfinn Nilsen, 78, Norwegian football player.
Germana Paolieri, 91, Italian actress.
Jess Present, 77, American politician.
László Szabó, 81, Hungarian chess grandmaster.
Aang Witarsa, 67, Indonesian football player.

9
Tony Baker, 53, American football player, car accident.
Bjarne Bø, 91, Norwegian actor.
Brynhild Haugland, 93, American politician.
George Child Villiers, 9th Earl of Jersey, 88, English nobleman and politician, heart attack.
Frankie Ruiz, 40, Puerto Rican singer and songwriter, liver cirrhosis.
Francisco Zúñiga, 85, Costa Rican-Mexican artist.

10
Bekim Berisha, 32, Kosovar Albanian soldier, killed in action.
Chuck Fenenbock, 80, American football player.
Sidney W. Fox, 86, American biochemist.
John Murphy, 47, Northern Irish loyalist, car accident.
Premji, 89, Indian actor and social reformer.
Habib Hassan Touma, 63, Palestinian composer and ethnomusicologist.

11
Bud Cooper, 85, American gridiron football player.
Heinz Döpfl, 59, Austrian pair skater.
Derek Newark, 65, English actor, heart attack following liver failure.
Nicky Verstappen, 11, Dutch homicide victim
Sergei Vonsovsky, 87, Soviet physicist.
Benny Waters, 96, American jazz saxophonist and clarinetist.

12
Jesús Loroño, 72, Spanish road racing cyclist.
D. R. Nagaraj, 44, Indian writer and cultural critic.
Gazi Shamsur Rahman, Bangladeshi lawyer, writer and television personality.
C. Dickerman Williams, American lawyer and free-speech advocate.

13
Nino Ferrer, 63, French singer, songwriter and author, suicide.
Edward Ginzton, 82, Ukrainian-American engineer.
Julien Green, 97, American writer.
Waneta Hoyt, 52, American serial killer, pancreatic cancer.
Karl Hubenthal, 81, American cartoonist, cancer.
Rafael Robles, 50, American baseball player.
Saturday Rosenberg, 46, Australian comedian, writer and actress, traffic accident.

14
Eve Boswell, 76, British pop singer.
Gary Evans, 43, American thief and serial killer, suicide.
Doug Fleming, 68, Australian rugby league football player.
Hans-Joachim Kulenkampff, 77, German actor and TV host, pancreatic cancer.
Rosemary Martin, 61, English actress.
Xavier Miserachs, 61, Spanish photographer, lung cancer.
Chalmers Wylie, 77, American politician.

15
Marc Akerstream, 44, Canadian actor and stuntman, head injuries from special effects explosion, head trauma.
Károly Polinszky, 76, Hungarian chemical engineer and politician.
Bill Shill, 75, Canadian ice hockey player.
Martinko Oswald, sa narodil

16
Dominique Davray, 79, French actress.
Wallace Fowlie, 89, American writer and academic.
Phil Leeds, 82, American actor (Rosemary's Baby, Ally McBeal, Ghost), pneumonia.
Frank Lewis, 85, American wrestler and Olympic champion.
Alain Marion, 59, French flutist, and, heart attack.
Jim Murray, 78, American sportswriter and Pulitzer Prize winner.
Kenneth Stafford Norris, 74, American marine mammal biologist, conservationist, and naturalist.
Dorothy West, 91, American novelist and short-story writer.

17
Robert B. Evans, 92, American automobile industry executive.
Terry Garvin, 61, Canadian professional wrestler, cancer.
Władysław Komar, 58, Polish shot putter and actor, car crash.
Johnny Lipon, 75, American baseball player.
Rita Roland, 83, German-born American film editor.
Irwin Suall, 73, American socialist, civil rights activist, and investigator, emphysema.

18
Protima Bedi, 49, Indian model, landslide.
Bernice Bing, 62, Chinese-American artist.
Harry J. Cargas, 66, American scholar and author.
Hoyt C. Hottel, 95, American chemical engineer and academic.
Persis Khambatta, 49, Indian model and actress (Star Trek: The Motion Picture), heart attack.
Kurt Schütte, 88, German mathematician.
Shane Shamrock, 23, American professional wrestler, altercation with police.
Otto Wichterle, 84, Czech chemist.

19
Vasili Arkhipov, 72, Soviet Navy officer during the Cuban Missile Crisis, kidney cancer.
Anne Asquith, 81, British code breaker.
Lawrence J. Fuller, 83, American Army major general, heart attack.
Max Holste, 84, French aeronautical engineer.
Boris Borisovich Kadomtsev, 69, Russian plasma physicist.
Ilva Ligabue, 66, Italian operatic soprano.
Sylvia Stahlman, 69, American soprano.
Yuri Yappa, 70, Soviet and Russian theoretical physicist.

20
Jimmy Brewster, 96, American gridiron football player.
Vivian Brown, 56, American sprinter and Olympian.
Ivan Godlevsky, 90, Soviet and Russian painter.
Oleg Prokofiev, 69, Artist, sculptor and poet.
Fred Sington, 88, American football and baseball player.
Haydée Tamzali, 91, Tunisian actress, writer, and filmmaker.
Vu Van Mau, 84, last Prime Minister of South Vietnam.

21
Hans van Abeelen, 61, Dutch behaviour geneticist.
Luis Dávila, 71, Argentine actor, heart attack.
Franz Eisenach, 80, German flying ace during World War II and recipient of the Knight's Cross of the Iron Cross.
John Stopford, 61, English rugby player.
Juanita Kidd Stout, 79, American attorney and jurist.
Wanda Toscanini, 90, Italian wife of pianist Vladimir Horowitz.

22
Jack Briggs, 78, American actor.
Sam Cooper, 89, American gridiron football player.
Evelyn Denington, Baroness Denington, 91, British politician, heart failure.
Sergio Fiorentino, 70, Italian classical pianist, heart attack.
Elena Garro, 81, Mexican screenwriter, journalist, and novelist, heart attack.
Minoru Murayama, 61, Japanese baseball player.
Jimmy Skidmore, 82, English jazz tenor saxophonist.
Woody Stephens, 84, Americanthoroughbred horse racing trainer, emphysema.

23
Ahmet Hamdi Boyacıoğlu, 78, Turkish judge.
Nikolay Kolesov, 42, Russian footballer.
Asadollah Lajevardi, Iranian conservative politician and warden, assassinated, homicide.
Rolf Søder, 80, Norwegian film actor.
John Woodcock, 44, American football player, heart attack.

24
Alexey Andreevich Anselm, 64, Russian theoretical physicist.
Manuel Azcárate, 81, Spanish journalist and communist politician, cancer.
Jerry Clower, 71, American stand-up comedian.
Charles Diggs, 75, American politician, stroke.
Manuel Álvarez Jiménez, 70, Chilean football player.
E. G. Marshall, 84, American actor (12 Angry Men, Tora! Tora! Tora!, The Defenders), Emmy winner (1962, 1963), lung cancer.
Gene Page, 58, American composer, arranger and record producer.
Levan Sanadze, 70, Georgian athlete and Olympic medalist.
Georges Senfftleben, 75, French track cyclist.
Jack Richard Williams, 88, American radio announcer and politician, cancer.

25
Mildred L. Batchelder, 96, American librarian.
Lamar Crowson, 72, American concert pianist and a chamber musician.
Lee Gunther, 63, American film editor and co-founder of Marvel Productions, stroke.
Floyd K. Haskell, 82, American lawyer and politician, pneumonia.
Vyacheslav Kochemasov, 79, Russian diplomat and politician.
Allan Macartney, 57, Scottish politician, heart attack.
Barbara Mandell, 78, British journalist, broadcaster, newsreader and travel writer.
Bob Montgomery, 79, American boxer, complications from a stroke.
Lennart Nyman, 81, Swedish football coach and sports administrator.
Jerry Wayne Parrish, 54, United States Army corporal and defector, kidney failure.
Lewis F. Powell, Jr., 90, American lawyer and jurist, pneumonia.
Gagik Sargsyan, 72, Armenian historian.

26
Genaro Ruiz Camacho, 43, American criminal, execution by lethal injection.
Wade Domínguez, 32, American actor, model, singer and dancer, respiratory failure.
Penny Edwards, 70, American actress, lung cancer.
Remo Giazotto, 87, Italian musicologist, music critic, and composer.
Jack Harlan, 81, American botanist, agronomist, and plant collector.
Robert Huebner, 84, American physician and virologist, pneumonia.
Jaanus Kuum, 33, Estonian-Norwegian racing cyclist, suicide.
Margaret Potter, 72, British writer.
Frederick Reines, 80, American physicist and winner of the Nobel Prize in Physics.
Ryūichi Tamura, 75, Japanese poet, essayist and translator, esophageal cancer.

27
Babalu, 56, Filipino comedian and actor, liver cancer.
Garry E. Brown, 75, American politician.
Kelly Chan, 41, Singaporean windsurfer, traffic accident.
Harry Jensen, 85, Australian politician.
Hunter Johnson, 92, American composer.
Gianni Hecht Lucari, 76, Italian film producer, and production manager.
Syd Owen, 76, English football player and coach.
Essie Summers, 86, New Zealand author.
Margaret Dauler Wilson, 59, American philosopher and academic.

28
George Büchi, 77, Swiss organic chemist and academic.
Lu Dadong, 83, Chinese politician, governor of Sichuan province.
Hirokazu Kobayashi, 69, Japanese aikido teacher.
Rajarethinam Arokiasamy Sundaram, 93, Roman Catholic bishop.
Jack Wright, 71, Australian politician and Deputy Premier of South Australia (1982-1985).
Nikolai Vladimirovich Zateyev, 72, Russian submariner and Soviet Navy officer, lung cancer.

29
Erik Asmussen, 84, Danish architect.
Antoinette Becker, 78, French-German children's author.
Richard Beebe, 68, American radio personality, lung cancer.
Minerva Bernardino, Dominican Republic diplomat and feminist.
Charlie Feathers, 66, American country music and rockabilly musician, stroke.
John Langston Gwaltney, 69, American writer and anthropologist.
Frances Hamerstrom, 90, American author, naturalist and ornithologist, cancer.
Ralph Pappier, 84, Argentine production designer, set decorator and film director.

30
Archie Glen, 69, Scottish football player.
Dan Kubiak, 60, American politician and businessman, cardiovascular disease.
Mykhaylo Mykhalyna, 74, Soviet-Ukrainian football manager and coach.
Denniz Pop, 35, Swedish DJ, music producer and songwriter, stomach cancer.
Irving Segal, 79, American mathematician.
Toss Woollaston, 88, New Zealand painter.

31
Sabiha Gökçül Erbay, Turkish school teacher and politician.
Keith Oxlee, 63, South African rugby player, complications following surgery.
Aage Poulsen, 79, Danish long-distance runner and Olympian.
Shigezō Sasaoka, 50, Japanese voice actor, typhoid fever.

References 

1998-08
 08